A Serious Case is a 1927 German silent comedy film directed by Felix Basch and starring Ossi Oswalda, Alfons Fryland, and Gyula Szöreghy. It was shot at the EFA Studios in Berlin. The film's sets were designed by the art director Ernst Stern.

Cast

References

External links

Films of the Weimar Republic
German silent feature films
Films directed by Felix Basch
1927 comedy films
German comedy films
German black-and-white films
Silent comedy films
1920s German films
Films shot at Halensee Studios